Nebe is a German surname.  Notable people with the surname include:

Arthur Nebe (1894–1945), German SS general and Holocaust perpetrator
Gabriele Nebe (born 1967), German mathematician
Herbert Nebe (1899–1985), German road bicycle racer

See also
Nebe is also the Czech word for "heaven"

German-language surnames